White Trash with Money is the tenth studio album by American country music artist Toby Keith. It was released on April 11, 2006 by Show Dog Nashville. This was Keith's first album for the label after DreamWorks Records went out of business. The album was distributed by Universal Music Group Nashville, the owner of Keith's catalog up to that point. The album shipped platinum, meaning one million or more units were distributed to outlets ahead of its release.

It features 12 tracks, including 3 "Bus songs". Keith wrote or co-wrote all of the songs; co-writing credits go to his longtime writing partner, his friend Scotty Emerick, with several tracks also being co-written by Dean Dillon. Keith co-produced the album with Lari White. Three singles were released from it: "Get Drunk and Be Somebody", "A Little Too Late" and "Crash Here Tonight", which reached #3, #2, and #15, respectively, on the Hot Country Songs charts, making this the first studio album of Keith's career since 1997's Dream Walkin' not to produce any number one hits.

Critical reception

White Trash with Money garnered positive reviews from music critics. At Metacritic, which assigns a normalized rating out of 100 to reviews from mainstream critics, the album received an average score of 67, based on 9 reviews.

Entertainment Weekly writer Chris Willman wrote that: "White Trash With Money — the first release on Keith's own label — might have even choicer cuts, but like the similarly indie-minded Prince, Keith is valuing prodigiousness over being a prodigy." Rolling Stones Christian Hoard called the album "an arena-ready collection of jokey rockers and sad-cowboy ballads that's as immaculate and assembly-line sturdy as a new SUV." He concluded that: "Considering White Trashs standard-issue honky-tonk, he'll have to try a lot harder to provoke listeners outside of his fan base." Randy Lewis of the Los Angeles Times wrote that: "Keith is flexing creative muscles that hadn't gotten a lot of use before last year, so even though the results here are inconsistent, it feels like a prelude to something truly memorable." Werner Trieschman of The Phoenix praised Keith's "sly baritone" being utilized to deliver his "sharp humor" throughout the album, saying that: "White Trash won't win over any haters, but it argues that if Keith's an insensitive meathead redneck, he's at least an insensitive meathead redneck with tunes and a voice."

Track listing

Personnel
Credits for White Trash with Money adapted from AllMusic.
Tim Akers - B3 organ, keyboards, synthesizer
Tom Bukovac - electric guitar
Chris Carmichael - fiddle
Glen Caruba - percussion
Perry Coleman - background vocals
George Del Barrio - orchestral arrangements, conductor
Dan Dugmore - electric guitar, steel guitar
Chris Dunn - trombone
Scotty Emerick - Classical Guitar, background vocals
Jarrod Emick - background vocals
Shannon Forrest - drums, box, background vocals
Kenny Greenberg - acoustic guitar
Wes Hightower - background vocals
Jim Horn - tenor sax, horn arrangements
Bill Hughes - string contractor
John Barlow Jarvis - piano, background vocals
Toby Keith - lead vocals
Wayne Killius - drum programming 
Randy Leago - baritone sax
Phil Madeira - B3 organ, slide guitar, Dobro, accordion
Steve Patrick - trumpet
Biff Watson - acoustic guitar, background vocals
Lari White - kazoo, background vocals
Glenn Worf - bass guitar, background vocals
Jonathan Yudkin - fiddle

Charts

Weekly charts

Year-end charts

References

External links
 

2006 albums
Toby Keith albums
Show Dog-Universal Music albums
Albums produced by Lari White
Albums produced by Toby Keith